Manolesta is a 1981 Italian comedy film directed by Pasquale Festa Campanile.

Plot 
Gino Quirino aka Manolesta, a thief and a con man, lives on a barge anchored on the Tiber with Bruno, his young son. Gino ends up in the crosshairs of the social worker Dr. Angela De Maria, and he is forced to find an honest job.

Cast 

 Tomas Milian: Gino Quirino
 Giovanna Ralli: Dr. Angela De Maria
 Paco Fabrini: Bruno 
 Clara Colosimo: social worker
 Nello Pazzafini: Atac's driver
 Ennio Antonelli

References

External links

1981 films
Italian comedy films
1981 comedy films
Films directed by Pasquale Festa Campanile
Films scored by Detto Mariano
1980s Italian-language films
1980s Italian films